Anges Patrick Kader Bohui is a professional soccer player who plays for Danish club Vejle Boldklub. Born in the Ivory Coast, he is a youth international for the United States.

Club career

America
Born in Ivory Coast, Bohui joined the Philadelphia Union Academy in 2017, where he played a few years on the Academy teams. He got his debut for Philadelphia Union II in the USL Championship in 2018, where he made eight appearances throughout the season. He scored two goals and added an assist in 9 appearances in the USL Championship in 2019 for Philadelphia Union II.

In November 2020, Bohui joined the academy of FC Cincinnati. In Cincinnati, Bohui only made two appearances and scores one goal for the club's U-19s.

Vejle
After a trial period in the autumn 2020, Bohui signed a deal with Danish Superliga club Vejle Boldklub on 14 January 2022.

References

External links 
 

2003 births
Living people
American soccer players
United States men's youth international soccer players
Ivorian footballers
American people of Ivorian descent
Association football forwards
Ivorian emigrants to the United States
Footballers from Abidjan
Soccer players from Pennsylvania
Sportspeople from Chester County, Pennsylvania
Sportspeople from Delaware County, Pennsylvania
Sportspeople from Montgomery County, Pennsylvania
Philadelphia Union players
Philadelphia Union II players
FC Cincinnati players
Vejle Boldklub players
USL Championship players
American expatriate sportspeople in Denmark
Ivorian expatriates in Denmark
Expatriate men's footballers in Denmark